An almond biscuit, or almond cookie, is a type of biscuit that is made with almonds. They are a common biscuit in many different cuisines and take many forms.

Types of almond biscuits include almond macaroons, Spanish almendrados, qurabiya (a shortbread biscuit made with almonds), and Turkish acıbadem kurabiyesi. In addition, Turkish şekerpare are often decorated with an almond.

In Norway, sandbakelse or sandkake are a type of almond cookie that is baked in fluted tins.

In Indonesia, almond crispy cheese is a type of crispy flat almond cookie with almond and cheese on top.

Gallery

See also

 Almond paste
 Chinese almond biscuit
 Macaroon
 List of cookies
 List of pastries

References

Biscuits
Almond cookies